Dr. Janice MacKinnon, Ph.D, C.M., S.O.M., FRSC (born January 30, 1947) is a Canadian historian and former Minister of Finance for the Province of Saskatchewan under NDP Premier Roy Romanow. She is currently a professor in the Department of History at the University of Saskatchewan.

Early life and education
Born Janice Potter in Kitchener, Ontario, she attended Huron University College of the University of Western Ontario, which awarded her an honours BA in 1969. She went on to earn an MA and Ph.D from Queen's University.

Political career
From 1991 to 2003, she was a Saskatchewan MLA. In addition to being Minister of Finance, she also held the following ministerial positions at various times: Minister of Social Services, Minister of Economic and Co-operative Development, Minister Responsible for Trade, Research and Investment and Government House Leader.

She is chair of the board of directors of the Institute for Research on Public Policy. She also sits on the board of directors for the Canada West Foundation.

In 2003, she was rumoured to be considering running for the Liberal Party of Canada in the following year's federal election though she ultimately declined. In 2005, she was made a Fellow of the Royal Society of Canada.

On January 25, 2008, MacKinnon was named Chair of the Board of Investment Saskatchewan - a Saskatchewan Crown Corporation managing investment capital and financing.

MacKinnon sits as an advisor to Canada's Ecofiscal Commission.

In 2019, MacKinnon was named the chair of the Blue Ribbon Panel on Alberta’s Finances by Alberta Premier Jason Kenney. The final report outlined 26 recommendations to improve Alberta's finances.

Personal life
She is married to Peter MacKinnon, the past President of the University of Saskatchewan. They have two children, Alan and William.

Notes

Selected bibliography
 The Liberty We Seek: Loyalist Ideology in Colonial New York and Massachusetts
 While the Women Only Wept: Loyalist Refugee Women
 Minding the Public Purse: The Fiscal Crisis, Political Trade-offs and Canada's Future

References
 

1947 births
Living people
Women government ministers of Canada
Deputy premiers of Saskatchewan
Fellows of the Royal Society of Canada
Finance ministers of Saskatchewan
Queen's University at Kingston alumni
Saskatchewan New Democratic Party MLAs
Members of the Executive Council of Saskatchewan
Academic staff of the University of Saskatchewan
University of Western Ontario alumni
Politicians from Kitchener, Ontario
Politicians from Saskatoon
Female finance ministers
Women MLAs in Saskatchewan
21st-century Canadian politicians
21st-century Canadian women politicians
Canadian women historians
20th-century Canadian historians
21st-century Canadian historians
Historians from Ontario